Robert Philippe Marie Allart  (born 29 November 1913, date of death unknown) was a Belgian male weightlifter who competed in the heavyweight class and represented Belgium at international competitions. He was born in Laeken. He won the bronze medal at the 1949 World Weightlifting Championships in the +82.5 kg category. He participated at the 1948 Summer Olympics in the +82.5 kg event finishing seventh and at the 1952 Summer Olympics. He won the silver medal at the 1949 European Championships in the Unlimited class (387.5 kg)

References

External links
 

1913 births
Year of death missing
Belgian male weightlifters
World Weightlifting Championships medalists
People from Laeken
Olympic weightlifters of Belgium
Weightlifters at the 1948 Summer Olympics
Weightlifters at the 1952 Summer Olympics
Sportspeople from Brussels
20th-century Belgian people